Abeytas is a census-designated place in Socorro County, New Mexico, United States. Its population was 56 as of the 2010 census. In 1950 it had a population of 10.

Demographics

Education
Its school district is Belén Consolidated Schools. Belén High School is the district's comprehensive high school.

References

Census-designated places in New Mexico
Census-designated places in Socorro County, New Mexico